Bezirk Scheibbs is a district of the state of Lower Austria in Austria.

Municipalities
Suburbs, hamlets and other subdivisions of a municipality are indicated in small characters.
 Gaming
 Altenreith, Brettl, Gaming, Gamingrotte, Hofrotte, Holzhüttenboden, Kienberg, Lackenhof, Langau, Maierhöfen, Mitterau, Nestelberg, Neuhaus, Pockau, Polzberg, Rothwald, Steinwand, Taschelbach, Trübenbach, Zürner
 Göstling an der Ybbs
 Eisenwiesen, Göstling an der Ybbs, Großegg, Hochreit, Königsberg, Lassing, Mendling, Oberkogelsbach, Pernegg, Steinbachmauer, Stixenlehen, Strohmarkt, Ybbssteinbach
 Gresten
 Gresten, Ybbsbachamt
 Gresten-Land
 Oberamt, Obergut, Schadneramt, Unteramt
 Lunz am See
 Oberndorf an der Melk
 Altenmarkt, Bach, Baumbach, Diendorf, Dörfl, Dürrockert, Eck, Edlach, Ganz, Gries, Grub, Gstetten, Hameth, Hasenberg, Holzwies, Koppendorf, Lehen, Lingheim, Listberg, Maierhof, Melk, Oberdörfl, Oberhub, Oberndorf an der Melk, Oberschweinz, Ofenbach, Perwarth, Pfoisau, Pledichen, Reitl, Rinn, Schachau, Scheibenbach, Scheibenberg, Steg, Straß, Strauchen, Sulzbach, Unterdörfl, Unterhub, Unterschweinz, Waasen, Weg, Weissee, Wiedenhof, Wies, Wildengraben, Wildenmaierhof, Zehethof, Zehethof, Zimmerau
 Puchenstuben
 Am Sulzbichl, Bergrotte, Brandeben, Brandgegend, Buchberg, Gösing an der Mariazellerbahn, Laubenbach, Puchenstuben, Schaflahn, Sulzbichl, Waldgegend
 Purgstall an der Erlauf
 Ameishaufen, Edelbach bei Purgstall, Erb, Feichsen, Föhrenhain, Gaisberg, Galtbrunn, Gimpering, Haag, Harmersdorf, Heidegrund, Hochrieß, Höfl, Koth, Kroißenberg, Mayerhof, Nottendorf, Öd bei Purgstall, Petzelsdorf, Pögling, Purgstall, Reichersau, Rogatsboden, Schauboden, Sölling, Söllingerwald, Stock, Unternberg, Weigstatt, Weinberg, Zehnbach
 Randegg
 Franzenreith, Graben, Hinterleiten, Hochkoglberg, Mitterberg, Perwarth, Puchberg bei Randegg, Randegg, Schliefau, Steinholz
 Reinsberg
 Buchberg, Kerschenberg, Reinsberg, Robitzboden, Schaitten
 Scheibbs
 Brandstatt, Fürteben, Fürteben, Ginning, Ginselberg, Heuberg, Hochbruck, Lueggraben, Miesenbach, Neubruck, Neustift, Saffen, Scheibbs, Scheibbsbach, Schöllgraben
 Sankt Anton an der Jeßnitz
 Anger, Gabel, Gärtenberg, Gnadenberg, Grafenmühl, Gruft, Hochreith, Hollenstein, Kreuztanne, St. Anton an der Jeßnitz, Winterbach, Wohlfahrtsschlag
 Sankt Georgen an der Leys
 Ahornleiten, Bach, Bichl, Dachsberg, Forsthub, Gries, Kandelsberg, Kreuzfeld, Kröll, Maierhof, Mitteröd, Oedwies, Ramsau, Schießer, St. Georgen an der Leys, Wiesmühl, Windhag, Zwickelsberg
 Steinakirchen am Forst
 Altenhof, Amesbach, Brandstatt, Dürnbach, Edelbach, Edla, Ernegg, Felberach, Götzwang, Haberg, Hausberg, Kerschenberg, Kleinreith, Knolling, Lonitzberg, Lonitzberg, Oberstampfing, Ochsenbach, Oed bei Ernegg, Oedt, Reith bei Weinberg, Schollödt, Schönegg, Steinakirchen am Forst, Straß, Stritzling, Unterstampfing, Windpassing, Zehetgrub, Zehethof
 Wang
 Berg, Ewixen, Griesperwarth, Grieswang, Höfling, Hofweid, Kaisitzberg, Lehmgstetten, Mitterberg, Nebetenberg, Pyhrafeld, Pyhrafeld, Reidlingberg, Reidlingdorf, Reitering, Schlott, Straß, Thurhofwang, Wang
 Wieselburg
 Wieselburg-Land
 Bauxberg, Berging, Bodensdorf, Brandstetten, Breitenschollen, Brunning, Dürnbach, Forst am Berg, Furth, Galtbrunn, Großa, Grub, Gumprechtsfelden, Haag, Hart, Austria|Hart, Holzhäuseln, Hörmannsberg, Kaswinkel, Köchling, Kratzenberg, Krügling, Leimstetten, Marbach an der Kleinen Erlauf, Moos, Mühling, Neumühl, Oed am Seichten Graben, Oed beim Roten Kreuz, Pellendorf, Plaika, Schadendorf, Sill, Ströblitz, Unteretzerstetten, Wechling, Weinzierl
 Wolfpassing
 Buch, Dörfl, Etzerstetten, Figelsberg, Fischerberg, Hofa, Keppelberg, Klein-Erlauf, Krottenthal, Linden, Loisingm, Stetten, Thorwarting, Thurhofglasen, Wolfpassing, Zarnsdorf

 
Districts of Lower Austria